Steve Pool  is a retired chief weather anchor. He began covering sports for KOMO-TV in Seattle in 1977 and eventually became the principal weather anchor for that station from 1984 to 2019.

Pool started his career at KOMO-TV as an intern while studying at the University of Washington. After graduating in 1978, Pool became a writer, reporter, and eventually a weather caster.

In the 1980s, Pool began hosting a program on KOMO-TV titled "Front Runners" which aired every Saturday.

In the 1990s, Pool was the host of a children's Direct-to-video series called "Little Steps"

Pool received eight Emmy Awards during his career and made more than 70 appearances on Good Morning America.

Additionally, he is the author of a book about weather and its forecasting, titled Somewhere, I Was Right.

In 2004, he was inducted in University of Washington Department of Communications Hall of Fame.

Pool announced his retirement from broadcasting in November 2019 after being treated successfully for prostate cancer.

References

External links
 
 Steve Pool's personal website

Living people
Daytime Emmy Award winners
Television anchors from Seattle
American television meteorologists
20th-century American journalists
American male journalists
Year of birth missing (living people)